Des Moines Township is a township in Pocahontas County, Iowa, USA.

History
Des Moines Township was organized in 1859. It is named from the Des Moines River that runs through it.

References

Townships in Pocahontas County, Iowa
Townships in Iowa